RTV Živinice or Televizija Živinice is a local Bosnian  public television channel based in the Živinice municipality. It was established on 4 May 1992 as one of the first TV stations in independent Bosnia and Herzegovina. 
In 1996, Television Živinice was registered as a public company, and in 2000, it was preregistered as a public institution founded by the Municipality of Živinice.

RTV Živinice broadcasts a variety of programs such as local news, sports, and documentaries. Programs are primarily produced in Bosnian.

References

External links 
 Official website of RTV Živinice
 Website of CRA BiH

Television channels and stations established in 1992
Television stations in Bosnia and Herzegovina